Wai-Kai Chen ( (Chen Wai-Kai), born December 23, 1936 in Nanjing) is a Chinese-American professor emeritus of electrical engineering and computer science.

Biography
Wai-Kai Chen's youth was troubled by the Sino-Japanese War of 1937–1945 followed by the civil war between the Nationalist and Communist forces. Born into an intellectual family, he had a twin brother Wai-Fah, an older brother Hollis, an older sister Eileen, a younger sister Helena, and a younger brother Wai-Sun. The family was on the Nationalist side. In 1949 Wai-Kai Chen's maiden aunt went with Wai-Sun and Helena went to Taiwan. Some time later, Wai-Kai, Wai-Fah, and Hollis made a harrowing and adventurous escape to Tawain. In Taipei, Wai-Kai and Wai-Fah entered formal education as sophomores in the Junior High School of Taiwan Normal University. In the 1950s Wai-Kai Chen went to the United States to study electrical engineering. In August 1962 in White Plains, New York, he married Shirley Chen (the sister of his friend Stanley S. Chen).

Wei-Kai Chen graduated in electrical engineering from Ohio University with a B.S. in 1960 and an M.S. in 1961 and from the University of Illinois Urbana-Champaign with a Ph.D. in 1964. From 1964 to 1981 he was a faculty member in the department of electrical engineering of Ohio University. From 1981 to 2001 he was a full professor and head of the department of electrical engineering and computer science at the University of Illinois Chicago. For the academic year 1970–1971 he was a visiting associate profess at Purdue University. For the 1st semester of the academic year 1979–1980 he was visiting professor at the University of Hawaiʻi at Mānoa. For the academic year 1986–1987 he held a visiting position at Chuo University, where he worked with Maskazu Sengoku and Shoji Shinoda. He has served as the editor-in-chief of the IEEE Transactions on Circuits and Systems I: Regular Papers and of the IEEE Transactions on Circuits and Systems II: Express Briefs, the president of the IEEE Circuits and Systems Society, and the founding editor-in-chief of the Journal of Circuits, Systems and Computers.

Chen is the author or editor of more than 30 books and the author or co-author of more than 280 technical articles. He was the co-author with John Choma (1941–2014) of Feedback Networks, published in 2007 by World Scientific. Chen has given more than 70 presentations at national or international conferences. He has done research on "VLSI circuits, broadband matching, active networks, filters, and applied graph theory especially its applications to parallel computations."

He received in 1967 the Lester R. Ford Award for his article Boolean Matrices and Switching Nets. He was elected in 1977 a fellow of the IEEE Circuits and Systems Society and in 1978 a fellow of the American Association for the Advancement of Science.

Among his books that are widely known among electrical engineers are: Applied Graph Theory, Theory and Design of Broadband Matching Networks, Active Network and Feedback Amplifier Theory, Linear Networks and Systems, Passive and Active Filters: Theory and Implements, Theory of Nets: Flows in Networks, The Circuits and Filters Handbook (3rd edition), The VLSI Handbook (2nd edition), and The Electrical Engineering Handbook''.

Selected publications

Articles
 
 
 
 
  (See Wang algebra.)
 
 
 
 
 
 
  (See Butterworth filter and Chebyshev filter.)
 
  1985

Books
 as author:
  (1st edition 1971)
  (1st edition, 1976)
  (1st edition, Brooks/Cole Engineering Division, 1983)
 
 
 
 
 as editor-in-chief:
  (1st edition, 1985)
  (1st edition, 1986)
  (1st edition, 1995)
 
 
 
 
 
 
  (1st edition, 2006)
  (1st edition, 2009)
  (1st edition, 2009)

References

1936 births
Living people
Chinese electrical engineers
American electrical engineers
Electrical engineering academics
20th-century Chinese engineers
21st-century Chinese engineers
20th-century American engineers
21st-century American engineers
Chinese emigrants to the United States
Educators from Nanjing
Fellows of the American Association for the Advancement of Science
Fellow Members of the IEEE
Ohio University alumni
University of Illinois Urbana-Champaign alumni
Ohio University faculty
University of Illinois Chicago faculty